Castrillo de Cepeda is a locality and minor local entity located in the municipality of Villamejil, in León province, Castile and León, Spain. As of 2020, it has a population of 132.

Geography 
Castrillo de Cepeda is located 62km west of León, Spain.

References

Populated places in the Province of León